The Airbus U.S. Manufacturing Facility is an assembly site for Airbus's Commercial Airplanes division, located at the Mobile Aeroplex at Brookley in Mobile, Alabama, United States. The plant is a major assembly and delivery site for Airbus commercial aircraft in the United States and one of the largest employment centers in the state. The site is one of four final assembly and delivery points for the Airbus A320 family and one of two final assembly and delivery points for the Airbus A220.

History 

In 2008, Airbus' parent company, European Aeronautic Defence and Space Company (EADS), was working with Northrop Grumman on a bid to supply aerial refueling tankers to the USAF. In their bid to supply the EADS/Northrop Grumman KC-45, based on the Airbus A330 MRTT, EADS planned to assemble the aircraft in Mobile, Alabama, after which they would have been modified at a neighboring facility by Northrop Grumman. EADS also announced plans to have its Airbus subsidiary shift Airbus A330 commercial freighter assembly to Alabama. Northrop Grumman and EADS planned to invest approximately US$600 million in new assembly plants in the United States adjacent to one another in the Brookley Complex in Mobile. EADS's failure to win the contract meant that the Alabama production line for the Airbus A330 was never set up.

Beginning on 27 June 2012, The New York Times and other news outlets reported that Airbus had decided to locate a new factory in Mobile for the manufacture of the Airbus A320 family (A319, A320 and A321) of airliners. The initial reports were soon confirmed by Mobile's Press-Register, which reported on 30 June 2012, that the deal had been approved by Airbus. The announced plans included a $600 million factory at the Brookley Aeroplex for the assembly of the aircraft, employing up to 1,000 full-time workers when at full capacity. Construction was scheduled to begin in 2013, with it becoming operable by 2015 and intending to produce 40 to 50 aircraft per year by 2017. The plan was formally announced by Airbus CEO Fabrice Brégier from the Mobile Convention Center on 2 July 2012. A ground breaking ceremony for the factory was held on 8 April 2013.

On 14 September 2015, Airbus officially opened the Mobile assembly line.

Aircraft in production

Airbus A320 

The Mobile plant is a final assembly line for the Airbus A320 family of narrow body aircraft. Aircraft assembled in Mobile are destined for North American airlines such as JetBlue, Delta Air Lines, American Airlines, Spirit Airlines, and Frontier Airlines. On 21 June 2015, the main fuselage components for the first aircraft built in Mobile arrived at the plant. The first aircraft, an A321, was delivered to JetBlue on 25 April 2016. 

All main fuselage parts are shipped by sea across the Atlantic from Hamburg, Germany. As scheduled, in December 2017 the assembly site produced the 50th aircraft and reached an output capacity of four planes per month.

Airbus A220 

In October 2017, Airbus announced it would acquire a majority stake in the Canadian Bombardier CSeries programme. With the agreement, the CSeries Aircraft Limited Partnership will be divided as Airbus at 50.01%, Bombardier Aerospace at 31%, and Investissement Québec at 19%. While manufacturing of the CSeries will continue at Bombardier's facilities in the province of Quebec, steep tariffs had tentatively been imposed on the Canadian-made planes being purchased by U.S. airlines. The plan to set up a second assembly line for the CSeries at the Airbus Mobile factory would mean that these aircraft would be domestically produced in the U.S. and avoid the possible tariffs. The United States International Trade Commission ruled three months later that the Canadian-made planes did not threaten the U.S. airplane industry and no duty orders would be issued.

Production of the A220 started in August 2019. The first aircraft from the new line, an A220-300, was delivered to Delta in October 2020.

See also 

 Boeing Renton Factory – A competing narrow-body aircraft manufacturing facility

References

External links 

Airbus A320 family
Buildings and structures in Mobile, Alabama
Industrial buildings and structures in Alabama
Airbus